RePRINT is the third studio album recorded by Hungarian band Amber Smith. The album was released on 10 March 2006 by the German Kalinkaland Records. The album was recorded at Akustair Studio and Fenn-Ti Studio from 2004 to 2005. The sound engineers were Levente Borsay and Jácint Jilling and it was mastered at Akustair Studio and mixed by Robin Guthrie, from the legendary Cocteau Twins. The song from this album, Hello Sun, brought international success for the band.

On 1 September 2005, the first single, Hello Sun, was released including three other songs, Sea Eyes, Pete and Julie and rePRINT.

Track listing

"Chemistry/Arithmetic"
"Hello Sun"
"Lindsay's Song"
"Sea Eyes"
"Identity"
"Reprint"
"White"
"July"
"Caleidoscope"
"Reprise"
"Holograms"

Personnel
The following people contributed to rePRINT:

Amber Smith
 Oszkár Ács - bass
 Bence Bátor - drums
 Zoltán Kőváry - guitars
 Imre Poniklo - vocals and guitars

Additional musicians
 Dávid Vesztergombi - cello
 Tímea Kerekes - viola
 Dóra Maros - violin
 Györgyi Tihanyi - violin

Production
 Robin Guthrie - mixing
 Gábor Deutsch - mixing
 Jácint Jiling - mastering

References

External links
 rePRINT at Kalinkaland's webpage
 rePRINT at Amber Smith's webpage

2006 albums
Amber Smith (band) albums